Jean Mouveroux (5 April 1902 – 15 March 1988) was a French racing cyclist. He rode in the 1928 Tour de France.

References

1902 births
1988 deaths
French male cyclists
Place of birth missing